The Colorado Castle Rocks was a 2007 expansion team from the National Indoor Football League.  They were to play their home games at the Douglas County Events Center in Castle Rock, Colorado, but no home games were played and their only game was a large defeat against the Wyoming Cavalry.

Season-by-season 

|-
|2007 || 0 || 1 || 0 || T-3rd Pacific Northern || --

References

External links
Official website

National Indoor Football League teams
Castle Rock, Colorado
American football teams in Colorado
American football teams established in 2006
American football teams disestablished in 2007
2006 establishments in Colorado
2007 disestablishments in Colorado